João Mamede Filho O.F.M. Conv. (born 21 August 1951) is the Brazilian Roman Catholic bishop of Diocese of Umuarama, being appointed in 2010.

Biography
Born in Caçapava in 1951, he joined the Order of Conventual Friars Minor in 1974, and was ordained a priest in 1978. On April 26, 2006 he was appointed bishop by Pope Benedict XVI and appointed to be auxiliary in São Paulo with the titular head office of Aquae Albae in Mauretania. He received episcopal ordination on 1 July 2006 from Cardinal Cláudio Hummes. His episcopal motto is "In the gospel strength of God".

From 2006 to 2010 he was auxiliary bishop of the Archdiocese of São Paulo and responsible for the Lapa Episcopal Region. On 24 November 2010 he was appointed bishop of Umuarama by Pope Benedict XVI and was sworn in on 12 February 2011.

He was appointed on 20 November 2019, apostolic administrator of the Archdiocese of Maringá, by Pope Francis, following the resignation of Anuar Battisti, and he held the post until 15 August 2020 when a successor was named.

References

External links 
Catholic-Hierarchy.org

1970 births
Living people
21st-century Roman Catholic archbishops in Brazil
People from São Paulo (state)
Conventual Franciscan bishops
Roman Catholic titular bishops
Brazilian Friars Minor